Luc Bélanger (born April 4, 1975) is a Canadian professional ice hockey goaltender who is currently playing with the Thetford Mines Isothermic in the Ligue Nord-Américaine de Hockey. Belanger played in the American Hockey League with the Quebec Citadelles during the 2001–02 AHL season.

References

External links

1975 births
Canadian ice hockey goaltenders
French Quebecers
Ice hockey people from Quebec
Living people
Mississippi Sea Wolves players
Moncton Alpines (QMJHL) players
Pont Rouge Lois Jeans players
Quebec Citadelles players
Quebec RadioX players
Sherbrooke Faucons players
Sherbrooke Saint-François players
Sportspeople from Sherbrooke
Thetford Mines Isothermic players